Jorge Ceciliano (born 30 May 1924), known as just Jorginho, was a Brazilian footballer. He played in three matches for the Brazil national football team in 1945. He was also part of Brazil's squad for the 1945 South American Championship.

References

1924 births
Possibly living people
Brazilian footballers
Brazil international footballers
Place of birth missing (living people)
Association footballers not categorized by position